Arabian toad-headed agama (Phrynocephalus arabicus) is a species of agamid lizard found in Saudi Arabia, Qatar, United Arab Emirates, Oman, Iran, and Jordan.

Description

It is one of 34 recognized species within the genus Phrynocephalus. In 2014, Melkinov split P. arabicus into 4 distinct species: arabicus sensu stricto, nejdensis, macropeltis, and ahvazicus. To date only P. ahvazicus has been formally recognized as a separate species.

P. arabicus sensu stricto is recognizable by its unique tail coloration. It has a white coloration on the underside of the tail with a black tip. When the animal is alerted the whole last quarter of the tail becomes black. P. arabicus also has a relatively long tail and a pointed snout. Adults may attain a snout-to-vent length (SVL) of 51 mm (2 in) and weigh 4.08g on average.

Behavior

This species is diurnal. They are insectivores and females only lay 1-2 eggs per clutch.

References

arabicus
Reptiles described in 1894
Taxa named by John Anderson (zoologist)